Edward Charles "Ed" Mandrake (born October 1, 1938 in Ethelbert, Manitoba – May 2, 2010) was a politician in Manitoba, Canada.  He was a member of the Legislative Assembly of Manitoba from 1988 to 1990, representing the west-end Winnipeg riding of Assiniboia for the Manitoba Liberal Party.

The son of Walter Mandrake, he  was educated at the Red River Community College, receiving a certificate in motor vehicle work.  He worked in vehicle body repair before entering politics.  Mandrake also served with the Canadian Army which he joined in 1956, holding administrative posts in Canada and Europe.  He was honourably released with the rank of Warrant Officer in 1968. In 1958, he married Marie Wiwchar.

Mandrake first ran for office in the 1988 provincial election, and defeated incumbent Progressive Conservative Ric Nordman by 187 votes in Assiniboia.  The Liberals increased their parliamentary representation from one seat to twenty in this election, and Mandrake sat as a member of the official opposition.  Liberal support trailed off in the provincial election of 1990, and he was defeated by PC candidate Linda McIntosh.  He did not seek a return to political office.

Mandrake later joined the Progressive Conservative Party of Canada.  In 2003, he signed a petition opposing the party's merger with the Canadian Alliance.

He died at the Victoria General Hospital in Winnipeg at the age of 71.

Election results

References

Manitoba Liberal Party MLAs
1938 births
2010 deaths
Red River College alumni